John Richard Carruthers (born 13 April 1970) is an English cricketer. Carruthers is a right-handed batsman who bowls right-arm medium-fast. He was born in Barnsley, Yorkshire.

Carruthers represented the Yorkshire Cricket Board in List A cricket.  His debut List A match came against the Gloucestershire Cricket Board 1999 NatWest Trophy.  From 1999 to 2001, he represented the Board in 6 List A matches, the last of which came against the Northamptonshire Cricket Board in the 2001 Cheltenham & Gloucester Trophy.  In his 6 List A matches, he scored 9 runs at a batting average of 3.00, with a high score of 9.  In the field he took a single catch.  With the ball he took 8 wickets at a bowling average of 22.75, with best figures of 2/16.

He currently plays club cricket for Hanging Heaton Cricket Club.

References

External links
John Carruthers at Cricinfo

1970 births
Living people
Cricketers from Barnsley
English cricketers
Yorkshire Cricket Board cricketers